Tairunnessa Memorial Medical College (TMMC) is a private medical school in Bangladesh, established in 1995. It is an institution of the Tairunnessa Memorial Medical Centre. It was founded by Mohammad Shamsul Hoque, named after his mother, the late Tairunnessa, a social reformer. There is a girls' school in her name in Balaganj as well.

It offers a five-year course of study leading to a Bachelor of Medicine, Bachelor of Surgery (MBBS) degree. A one-year internship after graduation is compulsory for  all graduates. The degree is recognised by the Bangladesh Medical and Dental Council, Medical Council of India, Nepal Medical Council, Maldives Medical and Dental Council, Bhutan Medical and Health council. It has affiliation with University of Dhaka.

M Shamsul Hoque was born in January 1943 in Hamidpur, Rajnagar in Moulvibazar District. He helped the religious minorities to flee the country with a small ship he owned. As a result, he was wanted by the Pakistani army in 1971. He established a School named Tairunnessa Girls' High School in Balaganj in 1977.

Tairunnessa Memorial Medical Center started as a small outpatient department at Konia, Gazipur District in 1995 which over the years has turned into a hospital and research center; TMMC Hospital, a 500-bed hospital complex, a 9 storied college building and an administrative block, a ladies' hostel & boys' hostel. It is now one of the renowned medical colleges in Dhaka with all departments.

Tairunnessa Memorial Medical College is listed in the World Directory of Medical Schools, published by the World Health Organization (WHO). World Directory of Medical Schools recognition allow TMMC medical students/ graduates to apply for USMLE examination by ECFMG for employment and for post-graduate training in the United States and Canada as well as can apply for PLAB, AMC and NZREX examinations etc. Also graduates of TMMC are eligible for limited registration with the General Medical Council of United Kingdom.

The TMMC has around 700 students, including students from Nepal and India. Omkar Medicom helps students of India to take admission in TMMC. The hospital has expanded to 600-beds, and provides a 24-hour emergency service, with additional trauma center, EPI etc. 515 MBBS doctors have passed till 2018 December.

See also
 List of medical colleges in Bangladesh

References

Medical colleges in Bangladesh
Hospitals in Bangladesh
Educational institutions established in 2002
2002 establishments in Bangladesh